= Café Carmellini =

Restaurant in New York City, U.S.

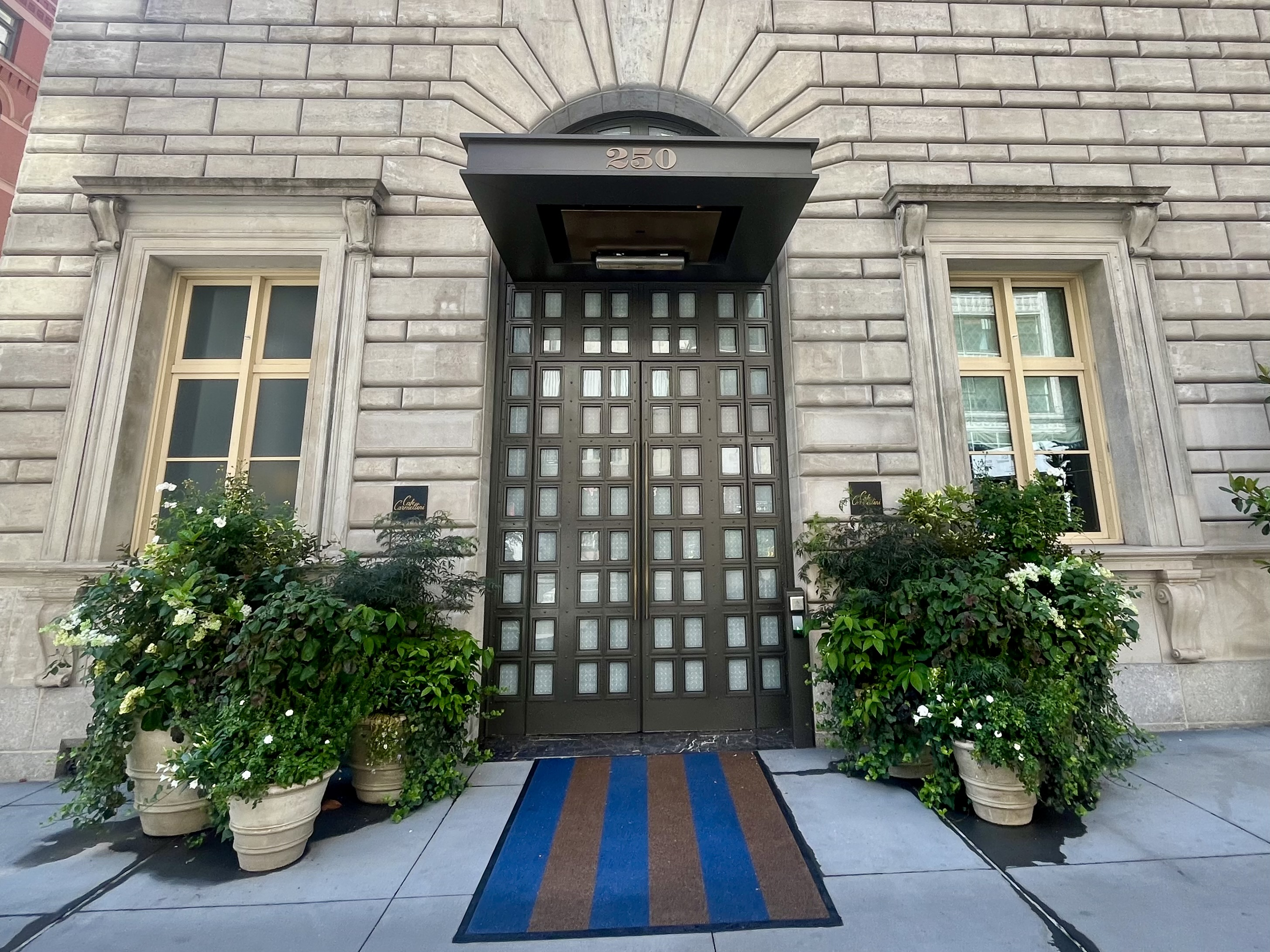
- The restaurant's exterior in 2024
- Interactive map of Café Carmellini

Restaurant information
- Established: November 1, 2023
- Location: 250 Fifth Avenue, New York City, New York, 10001, United States
- Coordinates: 40°44′42″N 73°59′15″W
- Website: cafecarmellini.com

Café Carmellini is a restaurant in New York City. It is located in The Fifth Avenue Hotel.
